Sun Sheng (ca. 302–373), courtesy name Anguo, was a Jin dynasty historian. He was a native of Pingyao County, Jinzhong, Shanxi. He was described to be very studious, and was never seen without holding a book in his hand from his youth to his old age.

Life
Sun Sheng's father Sun Xun (孫恂) was Grand Administrator of Yingchuan (潁川), in present-day Henan and Anhui. He was killed by bandits when Sun Sheng was nine, and the rest of the family fled to safety across the Yangtze River.

In his young adulthood, Sun Sheng achieved fame as a serious scholar of the I Ching, composing an essay which some of the leading luminaries of the time, including Yin Hao, Wang Meng, and Xie Shang were unable to debate with him. Parts of the essay, "The Symbols of the Book of Changes are More Subtle than the Visible Shapes of Nature", survive and have been translated by Richard B. Mather.

After entering politics, Sun Sheng served under Tao Kan, Yu Liang, and Huan Wen, accompanying the latter into Sichuan. On campaign, Huan Wen had taken his infantry to attack, and Sun Sheng was in charge of the weak, the elderly, and the baggage train, when they were suddenly set upon by thousands of bandits. The rearguard managed to rise to the occasion and drive them away. Huan Wen appointed Sun Sheng Marquis of Anhuai, in present-day Pingnan County, Guangxi, and he was attached to Huan Wen's household as a travelling secretary.

Following Huan Wen's first two northern campaigns, Sun Sheng was enfeoffed as Marquis of Wuchang (in present-day Pingjiang County, Hunan), and appointed Grand Administrator of Changsha. The poverty of his family drove him to engage secretly in trade; but although this breach of etiquette was discovered, he was not impeached, because of the great esteem in which he was held. He left Huan Wen's service under strained conditions, and ended his life in the position of Supervising Censor.

Works
Sun Sheng wrote the Wei Shi Chunqiu (Chronicles of the Clans of Wei) and Jin Yangqiu (Annals of Jin). A number of other works quoted by Pei Songzhi in his annotation of Records of the Three Kingdoms are attributed to Sun Sheng, including Yitong Zaji (Miscellaneous Records of Similarities and Differences), Shu Shi Pu (Genealogy of Shu), and Wei Shiji (Records of the House of Wei). All of his works have been lost, and survive now only in quotations.

Titles and Appointments Held
 Adjutant
 Marquess of Anhuai County
 Marquess of Wuchang County
 Grand Administrator of Changsha
 Supervising Censor

Family
Great-great-grandfather: Sun Zi (d 251)
Great-grandfather: Sun Hong
Grandfather: Sun Chu (d 293)
Father: Sun Xun (d 311)
Children:
Sun Qian
Sun Fang

Notes

References
 
 
 
 
 
 

4th-century Chinese historians
302 births
373 deaths
Jin dynasty (266–420) historians
Jin dynasty (266–420) politicians